BEST Education Network (BEST-EN), headquartered at James Cook University, Australia is an international, inclusive and collaborative network, focusing on the creation and dissemination of knowledge to support education and practice in the field of sustainable tourism.

History
The BEST Education Network emerged from a broader initiative known as Business Enterprises for Sustainable Travel, which was founded in 1998. The primary objective of BEST was to develop and disseminate knowledge in the field of sustainable tourism. In 2003 BEST went through organisational changes and the group overseeing the educational and curriculum aspects of the organisation became independent and renamed itself the BEST Education Network.

Structure
The BEST Education Network is coordinated by an international Executive Committee of academics with expertise in sustainable tourism. The committee is currently chaired by Dr. Gianna Moscardo.

Think Tanks
BEST-EN holds annual Think Tanks at various universities around the world, during which research is presented, sustainable tourism topics are discussed, and resources for teaching and practice in sustainable tourism are developed. The BEST Think Tanks draw together educators, researchers, consultants and practitioners from the tourism industry. Their knowledge and experience are incorporated into the design of various resources on sustainable tourism including research agendas, identification of issues, current research and implications for practice.

The Think Tanks consist of research presentations, keynote speakers, a research agenda, and curriculum development sessions. Each year the Think Tank has a particular theme and seeks to provide vision and cutting-edge insight to the topic at hand. Past themes have included:

Think Tank XIX: Creating Sustainable Tourist Experiences, San Fancisco State University, USA
Think Tank XVIII: Marketing of Sustainable Tourism Products, Lucerne University of Applied Sciences & Arts, Switzerland
Think Tank XVII: Innovation and Progress in Sustainable Tourism, University of Mauritius, Switzerland
Think Tank XVI: Corporate Responsibility in Tourism – Standards, Practices and Policies, Eberswalde University for Sustainable Development, Germany
Think Tank XV: The Environment-People Nexus in Sustainable Tourism: Finding the Balance, University of Pretoria, South Africa
Think Tank XIV: Politics, Policy and Governance in Sustainable Tourism, University of Ljubljana, Slovenia
Think Tank XIII: Engaging Communities in Sustainable Tourism Development, Taylor's University, Malaysia
Think Tank XII: Mobilities and Sustainable Tourism, SKEMA Business School, France
Think Tank XI: Learning for Sustainable Tourism, Temple University, USA
Think Tank X: Networking for Sustainable Tourism, Modul University Vienna, Austria
Think Tank IX: The Importance of Values in Sustainable Tourism, James Cook University, Singapore
Think Tank VIII: Sustaining Quality of Life through Tourism, Izmir University of Economics, Turkey
Think Tank VII: Innovations for Sustainable Tourism, The Northern Arizona University, USA
Think Tank VI: Corporate Social Responsibility for Sustainable Tourism, The University of Girona, Spain
Think Tank V: Managing Risk and Crisis for Sustainable Tourism: Research and Innovation, The University of West Indies, Kingston, Jamaica
Think Tank IV: Sustainability and Mass Destinations: Challenges and Possibilities, The University of Southern Denmark, Denmark
Think Tank III: Strategic Management and Events & Meeting Management, Costa Rica
Think Tank II: Tourism Transportation and Tourism Operations, University of Hawaii, USA
Think Tank I: Tourism Marketing, Tourism Planning, and Development and Human Resources Management, South Africa

The Think Tanks are open to academics, educators, researchers, government officials, industry experts, sustainability experts, environmental, economic, community, and cultural experts in the tourism field. Each Think Tank provides an opportunity for participants to highlight and explore topics that are of significance to the practice of tourism and/or sustainability. Interested delegates are invited to participate in workshops to identify 'hot topics' in sustainable tourism, outlining the specific problems linked to these topics, exploring the types of approaches that can be taken to develop 'cutting edge' research and solutions in these areas, and discussion of implications for stakeholder decision making and policy makers.

See also
Sustainable tourism
Eco-Tourism

References

External links 
BEST Education Network Homepage
INNOTOUR Homepage

Sustainable tourism
Travel-related organizations